Wilkes-Barre/Scranton International Airport  is mostly in Pittston Township, Pennsylvania, and spans the border between Luzerne County and Lackawanna County. It is owned and operated by the two counties; it is about 7 miles from Scranton and 8 miles from Wilkes-Barre. It is the fifth-largest airport in Pennsylvania by passenger count and calls itself "your gateway to Northeastern Pennsylvania and the Pocono Mountains".

History

In the 1920s, cities in Northeast Pennsylvania recognized the need for an airport, and U.S. Representative Laurence Hawley Watres of Scranton, the chairman of the U.S. House subcommittee that oversaw the growing commercial aviation industry, began to advocate for the project. Despite the depression and hard times affecting the coal mining industry, a windfall multimillion-dollar opportunity to build an airport was presented to Luzerne and Lackawanna Counties through their Public Works Administration. It became apparent that a modern airport would be needed for the economic survival of the region. The site in Avoca was first surveyed in 1939 by the County Commissioners boards of both counties.

In 1941, John B. McDade, father of Congressman Joseph M. McDade (whose name is on the current terminal building) and president of the Heidelberg Coal Co., donated 122 acres on which part of the airport now sits. Most of the land was previously owned by various coal companies.

Many U.S. airfields built in the World War II era were motivated as much by military defense as they were by civil aviation. The government funded construction of many airfields to develop a network that could be used by the military.

The proponents of a large bi-county airport continued their efforts in the early forties until late in 1944, when they succeeded in receiving a last minute commitment from the Administrator of Civil Aeronautics of the United States Department of Commerce, with the approval of a Board composed of the Secretaries of Navy, War, and Commerce, designating the project as necessary for national defense.

In early 1945, the two counties entered into a legal agreement to co-sponsor and operate the airport. During the negotiations of on-site selection and the bi-county operation plan, it was agreed that Scranton, the larger city and alphabetical first and closest in mileage should have second billing in name, since Luzerne County had the largest population. Thus, the Wilkes-Barre/Scranton Airport was named.

Construction of the airport took place from 1945 to June 1, 1947, when the Wilkes-Barre/Scranton Airport was dedicated.

Colonial Airlines and American Airlines were the first airlines at AVP (this three-letter code derives from its location near Avoca, Pennsylvania). In April 1948 Transcontinental & Western Air (later TWA) arrived, and All American Airways (later Allegheny Airlines) in June 1949. Colonial flew Montreal/Syracuse- Philadelphia/Washington with stops; American flew to Chicago/Buffalo-New York; TWA flew Kansas City/Pittsburgh-Albany/Boston; and All American had general interstate service and later a looping network to Newark, Atlantic City, Washington, and around again through Pennsylvania. Each airline started with DC-3s. The April 1957 OAG shows 32 departures a day: 14 Allegheny, 12 Eastern, 4 TWA, and 2 American. The first jets were Eastern 727s, in the May 1969 OAG; in March 1969 the longest runway was the 5200-ft runway 4, which grew to 6450 feet by 1972.

The airport became "international" in 1975 when cargo flights to Canada began.

The airport has had many celebrity visitors. Air Force One has landed with Bill Clinton, George W. Bush, Barack Obama, Donald Trump and Joe Biden for fundraisers and campaign trips. A charter plane carrying Hillary Clinton used the airport during her presidential campaign in 2008. In August 2013, President Obama and 10 year Scranton-native Vice President Joe Biden visited the region for a campaign event. President Donald Trump visited the airport on November 2, 2020, and held a campaign rally on the tarmac.

In May 2006, the airport completed an 80 million dollar new terminal and garage. The terminal, designed by HNTB, has jetways, a larger waiting area, more gates and a shopping and dining area.

A new control tower and TRACON facility opened on August 29, 2012, and was paid for with $13.3 million from the American Recovery and Reinvestment Act of 2009. The old tower's view of the second runway had been blocked by the new terminal. All 25 controllers stayed to work in the new facility.

On May 18, 2017, demolition began on the former airport terminal.

The old terminal was demolished in early 2018. The site is now a cell phone parking lot and parking for airport staff.

Former carriers
All American Airways (renamed to Allegheny Airlines, then to USAir, then to US Airways before merging with American Airlines)
Colonial Airlines (1947–1956, merged with Eastern Air Lines)
Delta Airlines (ended in 2020)
Eastern Airlines (1956–1989)
TWA (1948–1966)
Vacation Express (March 11, 2003 – September 7, 2004)
Hooters Airlines (October 26, 2005 – March 26, 2006)
Allegiant Air (June 21, 2012-January 4, 2018)

Air Show

The Wilkes-Barre/Scranton International Airport was the host of an air show between 1983 and 2000. The show was temporarily suspended due to construction of a new terminal; however, it was expected to return after construction was completed. Later that year, reports said the planned renovations to the airport would leave no room for the air show. In early 2017, The Bi-County Airport Board unanimously approved hosting the Northeastern Pennsylvania Air Show at the Wilkes-Barre/Scranton International Airport from August 12–13, 2017. The show, back after a 17-year absence, featured several acts:

• U.S. Army Golden Knights Parachute Team

• U.S. Air Force Heritage Flight Team

• F-22 Raptor Demo team

• U.S. Navy F/A-18 TacDemo Team

It was announced that the airshow would return in 2020, where the U.S. Air Force Thunderbirds are scheduled to perform at the airshow August 22 and 23, 2020.

Facilities
 
The airport covers 910 acres (368 ha) and has two asphalt runways:

 4/22 is 7,502 × 150 ft (2,287 × 46 m)
 10/28 is 4,300 × 150 ft (1,311 × 46 m).

General aviation uses the fixed-base operator (FBO) Aviation Technologies.

U.S. Customs and Border Protection
The Bureau of U.S. Customs and Border Protection has a property located on airport grounds — on the FBO side of the airport, near the hangars. This U.S. Customs Service office serves as a facilities and crossings for Harrisburg's port of entry.

Customs
The airport has no scheduled international service, but it has a location to process international flights, on the lower level near Gates 1 & 2, where the airport can isolate international passengers from domestic. With advance notice, the airport can process scheduled international flights or flights that have diverted to AVP.

Terminal
The airport has one passenger terminal with 8 gates. Gates 1 and 2 are on the lower level; Gates 3 through 8 are on the second floor.

Gate assignments:
 American Eagle: 2, 3 and 5
 United Express: 1, 7 and 8
Gate 7 is used for charter flights and diversions. Gates 1 & 2 are on the lower level and were used by American Eagle & United Express for their turboprops. Since they switched to jets, these two gates are not used daily. Jets are parked here if all the other gates are being used or for diversions. Gates 4 and 6 used to be used by Delta Airlines and Delta Connection. Since Delta ended service, these two gates are not used daily.

Airlines and destinations

Passenger

Cargo

Statistics

Top destinations

Annual traffic

Ground transportation

Car
The airport has direct access to I-81 via Exit 178. The Pennsylvania Turnpike (Interstate 476) can also be accessed from I-81 Southbound via Exit 175.

Bus
The Luzerne County Transportation Authority offers route number 17 from the airport to Wilkes-Barre, Scranton, and points en route.

Car Rentals, TNCs and Taxi Service
The following rental car companies provide their services at Wilkes-Barre: Avis, Budget, Dollar, Enterprise, Hertz and National. The rental car lot is across from the terminal. With regards to Transportation Network Companies, or TNCs, Uber and Lyft have specific pick-up locations in front of the Terminal Building, on the arrivals side. Taxi service is provided by Burgit's City Taxi, Call-a-Car Taxi and McCarthy Flowered Cabs.

Accidents and incidents
AVP is a popular location for diversions.
 On April 20, 1985 AF ser. No. 62-4496, a USAF CT-39A experienced brake failure on landing at the Wilkes-Barre Scranton International Airport, killing all five passengers and crew aboard, including General Jerome F. O'Malley, Commander, Tactical Air Command, and his wife.
 On May 21, 2000, Bear Creek Township was the site of a crash of an Executive Airlines chartered Jetstream 31, it crashed while attempting to land at Wilkes-Barre/Scranton. As described by the BBC, the crash occurred in a "wooded area" of the township, near the intersection of Bear Creek Boulevard (PA-Route 115) and the Northeast Extension of the Pennsylvania Turnpike. The accident killed the pilot and all 19 passengers. NTSB investigation ruled that the crash was probably due to low fuel. The incident spurred an FBI investigation and made news across the globe. Passenger safety in the aviation field became a major issue of the 2000 U.S. presidential election.
 On January 7, 2011 Delta Air Lines flight #4061 returned to the airport when the pilot realized, after takeoff, that the nose gear would not retract.
 On November 1, 2013 U.S. Airways Express flight #4394 from Philadelphia International Airport to Albany International Airport made an emergency landing due to smoke in the cockpit. 12 passengers and 3 crew members were on board and no injuries were reported.
 On February 25, 2014 a US Airways flight from New England to Philadelphia was diverted when cockpit lights indicated a mechanical issue. 42 passengers and three crew members were on board, and no injury were reported during the emergency landing.
 On April 1, 2016 a Virgin America Airbus A320 landed at AVP due to high winds and bad weather in the New York area. The plane took off from LAX and was scheduled to John F. Kennedy International Airport.
 On September 6, 2016 a United Airlines flight made an emergency landing after the pilot reported a fuel imbalance.
 On February 26, 2017 an American Eagle flight #4858 from AVP to Philadelphia International Airport returned to AVP after a landing gear failure. There were no injuries reported.
 On July 11, 2017, a private plane traveling from Morristown, New Jersey, to Philadelphia, Pennsylvania, made an emergency landing at AVP due to a landing gear failure. According to news outlets, "They tested the landing gear, flew in front of the tower, and the tower advised them it was not locking in place so the pilot made the decision to land on our runway, which he did successfully," Airport President Carl Beardsley said. The airport was closed for about an hour and a half while crews cleared the scene. No injuries were reported. A Delta flight had to be rerouted due to the airport closure.
 On February 7, 2019 a Porter Airlines flight made an emergency landing in AVP due to engine failure. All 34 passengers aboard and four crew members were safe. The aircraft stayed in AVP for repairs, while the company sent another aircraft to resume the flight. The Q400 took off from Newark and was heading to Toronto Island Airport.
 On August 20, 2021 a North American T-6 Texan crashed shortly after takeoff, killing the sole pilot. The aircraft was practicing for an upcoming airshow at Pocono Raceway as part of the Skytypers Air Show Team. A preliminary report from the National Transportation Safety Board has been released.

References

External links
 Wilkes-Barre/Scranton International Airport (official site)
 Wilkes-Barre/Scranton International Airport at Pennsylvania DOT Bureau of Aviation
 
 

Airports in Pennsylvania
County airports in Pennsylvania
Scranton–Wilkes-Barre metropolitan area
Transportation buildings and structures in Luzerne County, Pennsylvania